Henry Middleton (September 28, 1770June 14, 1846) was an American planter and political leader from Charleston, South Carolina. He was the 43rd Governor of South Carolina (1810–1812), represented South Carolina in the U. S. Congress (1815–1819).

Life
Middleton served as Minister to Russia (1820–1830), being sent there in the first instance to replace George Washington Campbell, so as to look after interests in the discussions preparatory to arbitration by Czar Alexander I on the question of compensation under Article 1 of the Treaty of Ghent as regards enslaved Americans who went away with British during and after the War of 1812.

His summer home at Greenville from 1813-1820, known as Whitehall, was added to the National Register of Historic Places in 1969. He and his family also spent some of their summer in Newport, RI staying at Stone Villa (demolished in 1957).

Family
His father (Arthur Middleton) and his grandfather (Henry Middleton) had both served in the Continental Congress. Williams Middleton was his son. He had 14 children with wife Mary Helen Hering, daughter of Julines Hering (1732–1797), a planter on Jamaica: ten of their children lived into adulthood, including his youngest son Edward Middleton.

References

External links
United States Congress Biography of Henry Middleton
SCIway Biography of Henry Middleton
NGA Biography of Henry Middleton

1770 births
1846 deaths
People from London
Middleton family
American people of Barbadian descent
American people of English descent
Democratic-Republican Party members of the United States House of Representatives from South Carolina
Governors of South Carolina
Democratic-Republican Party state governors of the United States
Members of the South Carolina House of Representatives
South Carolina state senators
Ambassadors of the United States to Russia
19th-century American diplomats
University of South Carolina trustees